Suleiman Adamu ( - 30 April 2020) was a Nigerian politician. He was serving as a member of the Nasarawa State House of Assembly, representing Nasarawa Central constituency, at the time of his death due to COVID-19 in April 2020.

Death
Suleiman Adamu died from COVID-19 at Federal Medical Centre (FMC) in Keffi, Nasarawa State, Nigeria, on 30 April 2020. He was buried on 1 May in his hometown, Nasarawa. His test results, which were not completed until after he died, confirmed COVID-19.

Adamu was the first recorded fatality from COVID-19 in Nasarawa State during the COVID-19 pandemic in Nigeria.

In response to his death, the state government closed the Nasarawa State House of Assembly building for decontamination and imposed a lockdown on Suleiman Adamu's hometown of Nasarawa to slow the spread of COVID-19.

References

Year of birth unknown
Date of birth unknown
2020 deaths
Place of birth missing
Members of the Nasarawa State House of Assembly
People from Nasarawa, Nasarawa State
1963 births
Deaths from the COVID-19 pandemic in Nigeria